Tonnerre (L9014; lit. Thunder) is an amphibious assault helicopter carrier of the Marine Nationale. She is the eighth vessel to bear the name and the second ship in the  amphibious assault ship series.

Construction and career 

Tonnerre was laid down in two parts. On 26 August 2003, the aft part was laid down by Arsenal de Brest at Brest and the bow part was laid down 5 May 2004 by Chantiers de Saint-Nazaire at Saint-Nazaire. The vessel was launched on 26 July 2005 and began active service in December 2006.

Tonnerres maiden voyage occurred between 10 April and 24 July 2007. During this voyage, Tonnerre was involved in Opération Licorne, the French co-deploying complement to the United Nations Operation in Côte d'Ivoire following the Ivorian Civil War. Gazelle and Cougar helicopters of the French Air Force operated from the ship beginning on 9 July.

At the start of 2008, Tonnerre was involved in the Corymbe 92 mission (see Standing French Navy Deployments), a humanitarian mission in the Gulf of Guinea.

In May 2011, the French Military deployed Tiger and Gazelle helicopters on the ship to augment forces engaged in Opération Harmattan and later Operation Unified Protector during the Libyan Civil War. along with allied ships such as the British helicopter carrier  which also provided its own attack helicopters.

In 2020, Tonnerre was deployed to Beirut, Lebanon, shortly after an ammonium nitrate explosion at the city's port killed roughly 200 people and caused significant destruction, including the loss of the nation's main grain elevator. Around 350 personnel were to join the clean-up efforts around the port, which was expected to take weeks.

In 2021, Tonnerre deployed to the Pacific accompanied by the frigate , to conduct the joint La Perouse naval exercise with the four Quadrilateral Security Dialogue members participating.

From 18 November to 2 December 2021, Tonnerre took part in Exercise Polaris 21 in the western Mediterranean Sea. In late 2022 she operated with the frigate  in anti-piracy operations in the Gulf of Guinea.

See also 
 List of ship launches in 2005

References

Further reading
</ref>

External links

 BPC Tonnerre  Force Projection and Command Ship Tonnerre on Alabordache
 BPC Tonnerre Force Projection and Command Ship Tonnerre

Mistral-class amphibious assault ships
Ships built in France
Amphibious warfare vessels of France
2005 ships